The Dr. Albert Johnson House is a historical house located at 814 Duke Street in the Bottoms neighborhood of Alexandria, Virginia, United States. It was added to the National Register of Historic Places on January 16, 2004.

A 19th century building in the Italianate townhouse style, it is noted for being the place where Dr. Albert Johnson, one of the first licensed African-American physicians in Alexandria once lived and held his practice.

The townhouse is a two-story, north facing building which consists of three bays, a side-hall building with a raised basement. It underwent renovation in 1974.

See also
National Register of Historic Places listings in Alexandria, Virginia

References

Houses in Alexandria, Virginia
Houses on the National Register of Historic Places in Virginia
National Register of Historic Places in Alexandria, Virginia